is a Japanese actress and singer. She won the award for best actress at the 19th Japan Academy Prize for Kura.

Her biggest hit was "Sexy Bus Stop" released in 1976. It reached the No. 12 position on the Oricon chart list.

Filmography

Films
 The Devil's Island (1977)
 The War in Space (1977)
 Sorobanzuku (1986)
 Ruten no umi (1990) 
 Bloom in the Moonlight (1993)
 Kura (1995)
 Dora-heita (2000)
 Oh! Oku (2006)
 SPEC: Ten (2012)
 SPEC: Close (2013)

Television
 Momotarō-zamurai (1981)
 Shounen wa Tori ni Natta (2001)
 Kōmyō ga Tsuji (2006) as Nene
 Totto-chan! (2017) as Sadako Sawamura

References

1960 births
Living people
Japanese actresses
Japanese women singers
Japanese idols
Actors from Kobe
Musicians from Kobe